War Memorial Park may refer to:

War Memorial Park (West Bridgewater, Massachusetts)
War Memorial Park, Coventry, England
War Memorial Park, Singapore
Kangaroo Ground War Memorial Park, Kangaroo Ground, Victoria, Australia
Irish National War Memorial Gardens

See also 
 War Memorial (disambiguation)